The 2022 World Modern Pentathlon Championships was held from 23 to 31 July 2022 in Alexandria, Egypt. 170 athletes from 35 countries competed in the championships.

Originally championships were meant to be held in China, but due COVID-19 restriction championships been moved to Egypt.

Schedule

Medal table

Medal summary

Men

Women

Mixed

References

World Modern Pentathlon Championships
World Championships
World Modern Pentathlon Championships
International sports competitions hosted by Egypt
World Modern Pentathlon Championships